Life Stories is the 13th studio album by Earl Klugh released in 1986. This release, "sets Klugh`s ballads against a variety of musical backgrounds, including violins, flutes, electric guitars and a variety of synthesizers". As in some of his previous albums, Klugh is joined by David Matthews and Grammy Award winner Don Sebesky who conducted and arranged some of the songs.

Track listing 
Information based on Liner Notes

"The Traveler" (Written by Earl Klugh) - 4:07 Strings arranged by Don SebeskySynthesizer arranged by Greg PhillinganesRhythm arranged by Earl Klugh, Gene Dunlap, Calvin Bryant & Thom Hall
"Just for Your Love" (James Gadson, Clarence McDonald, Alan Abrahams) - 4:13 Strings by Don Sebesky
"Second Chances" (Earl Klugh) - 3:59 Rhythm & Synthesizer arranged by Earl KlughAdditional Synthesizer arranged by Greg Phillinganes
"For the Love of You" (Ernie Isley, Marvin Isley, Chris Jasper, O'Kelly Isley, Ronald Isley, Rudolph Isley) - 3:59 Rhythm arranged by Earl KlughStrings arranged by Don SebeskySynthesizer arranged by Greg Phillinganes
"Debra Anne" (Written and Arranged by Earl Klugh) - 3:42
"Santiago Sunset" (Written by Earl Klugh) - 4:33 Chamber Ensemble arranged by Don Sebesky
"Sandman" (Written and Arranged by Earl Klugh) - 4:46
"Return of the Rainmaker" (Written by Earl Klugh) - 6:11
"Moon and the Stars" (Written and Arranged by Earl Klugh) - 3:32
"The Traveler, Pt. 2" (Written by Earl Klugh) - 2:45

Notes
”Just for Your Love” originally performed by The Memphis Horns
”For the Love of You” originally performed by The Isley Brothers

Personnel 
Information is based on the album’s Liner notes

Earl Klugh - Guitar (All tracks), Mandolin (9), Keyboards (3, 5)
Skip Anderson - Keyboards (8)
Crusher Bennett - Percussion (7)
Michael Brecker - Saxophone Solo (8)
Calvin Bryant - Bass played by (1-2)
Vivian Cherry - Background Vocals (2, 4)
Gene Dunlap - Drums (1-2, 10), Drum Machine (3, 5)
Frank Floyd - Vocals (10, Background on 2, 4)
Eric Gale - Additional Guitar (2)
Thom Hall - Keyboards (1-2)
Bruce Hervey - Finger Snaps (2)
Luico Hopper - Bass played by (4, 8)
Yvonne Lewis - Background Vocals (2, 4)
Jimmy Maelen - Percussion (1, 4, 10)
John Mahoney - Synthesizer programming (1)
Ray Marchica - Drums (8)
Dave Matthews - Orchestra arranger, Orchestra conductor (8)
Ullanda McCullough - Background Vocals (2)
Greg Phillinganes - Keyboards (1, 10, additional on 3), Synthesizer (4), Bass Synth (5), Finger Snaps (2)
Don Sebesky - Conductor (1-2, 4, 6)
Richard Tee - Additional Keyboards (2)
Eric Weisberg - Pedal Steel Guitar (5)
Buddy Williams - Drums (4), Cymbal (3)

Charts

References 

1986 albums
Earl Klugh albums
Albums arranged by David Matthews (keyboardist)
Albums arranged by Don Sebesky
Warner Records albums